William O'Hanlon (10 March 1863 – 23 June 1940) was an Australian cricketer. He played four first-class matches for New South Wales between 1884/85 and 1888/89.

See also
 List of New South Wales representative cricketers

References

External links
 

1863 births
1940 deaths
Australian cricketers
New South Wales cricketers
Cricketers from Melbourne